Beginning with the 2017–18 NBA season, Nike Inc. became the uniform and apparel maker for the National Basketball Association (NBA). The Nike swoosh appeared on the front right shoulder of player uniforms for the first time in league history. In July 2020, the NBA and Jordan Brand announced that all 30 teams would feature the "Jumpman" logo on the front right shoulder of Statement jerseys, worn during big games or rivalries, and left leg of shorts beginning with the 2020–21 season. The Charlotte Hornets were the only team to feature the "Jumpman" logo previous to this announcement due to Michael Jordan's ownership.

Due to its commonplace in European soccer leagues and Australian sports, the NBA announced that teams could sell one sponsorship to be featured over the front left shoulder of player uniforms. The following list denotes the sponsor for each of the 30 teams in the NBA:

References

National Basketball Association lists
National Basketball Association history by team
2017–18 NBA season
2018–19 NBA season
2019–20 NBA season